Eneko Undabarrena Ubillo (born 10 March 1993) is a Spanish footballer who plays as a midfielder for CF Intercity.

Club career
Born in Bilbao, Biscay, Basque Country, Undabarrena made his senior debut with local side Santutxu FC in 2012, in Tercera División. In 2014, after a year at JD Somorrostro in the regional leagues, he moved straight to Segunda División B with SD Amorebieta.

On 11 July 2016, Undabarrena signed for SD Leioa also in the third division. He agreed to a deal with fellow league team CD Mirandés on 8 January 2018, but moved to Burgos CF in the same category on 20 July, on a two-year contract.

Undabarrena became a regular starter for the Burgaleses, and helped in their promotion to Segunda División in 2021 as team captain with two goals in 25 appearances (play-offs included). He made his professional debut at the age of 28 on 15 August of that year, starting in a 0–1 away draw against Sporting de Gijón.

On 4 July 2022, Undabarrena signed a two-year deal with Primera Federación newcomers CF Intercity.

Personal life
In 2012, while playing for Santutxu, Undabarrena was one of the chosen players of Nike's The Chance in his hometown. He is not related to fellow player Iker Undabarrena, who also plays as a midfielder.

References

External links

1993 births
Living people
Footballers from Bilbao
Spanish footballers
Association football midfielders
Segunda División players
Segunda División B players
Tercera División players
Divisiones Regionales de Fútbol players
SD Amorebieta footballers
SD Leioa players
CD Mirandés footballers
Burgos CF footballers
CF Intercity players
Santutxu FC players